Leighton Andrews (born 11 August 1957) is an academic and former Welsh Labour politician.  He was the National Assembly for Wales member for Rhondda from 2003 until 2016. He was Minister for Children, Education & Lifelong Learning from 2009 to 2011, then Minister for Education and Skills in the Welsh Government until his resignation on 25 June 2013 after an alleged conflict between his own departmental policy and his active campaigning to save a school in his constituency. In September 2014 he returned to the government as Minister for Public Services.

He left the Labour Party in 2019, attacking the party's failure to deal with anti-semitism and its attitude to Brexit under Jeremy Corbyn, but sought to rejoin in 2020, having voted Labour at the 2019 UK General Election.

Background and education
Andrews was born in Cardiff, and brought up in Barry until the age of 11, when his family moved to Dorset.  He holds a BA Honours (English and History) from the University of Wales, Bangor and an MA in History from the University of Sussex. He was a sabbatical officer in the students union at Bangor in 1978. He has been a visiting professor at the University of Westminster from 1997 to 2002; and has been an Honorary Professor at Cardiff University since 2004. He was appointed as Professor of Practice in Public Service Leadership and Innovation, Cardiff Business School, in August 2016.

Andrews is married to Ann Beynon, formerly BT Director Wales; the couple have two children.

Professional career
Parliamentary Officer, Age Concern, 1982–84
UK Campaign Director, UN International Year of Shelter for the Homeless, 1984–87
Public Affairs Consultant 1988–1993 and 1997–2002
Head of Public Affairs for the BBC from 1993–96, based in London, responsible for the BBC's relations with the UK Parliament and with the EU institutions
Lecturer at Cardiff University School of Journalism, Media and Cultural Studies prior to his election to the National Assembly.

He is a published academic, whose peer-reviewed articles and chapters include The National Assembly for Wales and broadcasting policy, 1999–2003 Media, Culture & Society, Vol. 28, No. 2, 191–210 (2006); Wales and the UK’s Communications Legislation 2002–2003, Cyfrwng 2005, and Spin: from tactic to tabloid, Journal of Public Affairs, Volume 6, Issue 1, Date: February 2006, Pages: 31–45 and the chapter 'Lobbying for a new BBC Charter' in The Handbook of Public Affairs edited by Phil Harris and Craig Fleischer, Sage, 2006. Since his return to academia in 2016 he has continued to publish in academic journals such as Public Administration, the International Communications Gazette and Political Quarterly.

Chapters in other books include 'New Labour, New England', in The Blair Agenda, Ed. Mark Perryman, Lawrence and Wishart, 1996, 'Too important to leave to the Politicians' in The Road to the National Assembly for Wales, ed J.Barry Jones and Denis Balsom, 'The Breakdown of Tom Nairn', in Gordon Brown: Bard of Britishness, edited by John Osmond, IWA, 2006, and the Labour chapter in Welsh Politics Come of Age: Responses to the Richard Commission edited by John Osmond, IWA, 2004,

He has written three books, Wales Says Yes (Seren, 1999), Ministering to Education (Parthian, 2014) and Facebook, the Media and Democracy (Routledge, 2019).

Political career
Andrews was an active Liberal Party member in the 1970s and 1980s. He was elected as a Union of Liberal Students member of the National Union of Students (NUS) executive in 1979 and stood as the Liberal Alliance candidate for Gillingham in the 1987 General Election at the age of 29. On returning to Wales to live in 1996 he was appointed to the board of Tai Cymru – Housing for Wales by the Conservative Secretary of State for Wales, William Hague.

He was co-founder of the Yes for Wales campaign for the 1997 Welsh devolution referendum. During the referendum campaign he produced a paper with Gareth Hughes, then of the Welsh Federation of Housing Associations (now known as Community Housing Cymru) and now of ITV Wales, arguing that savings could be found to liberate more funding for housing from the Government's proposal to abolish Tai Cymru as part of the devolution settlement.

National Assembly for Wales
He joined the Labour Party following the successful referendum campaign for a Welsh Assembly.  He is the author of Wales Says Yes, a history of that campaign.

In 2002 Andrews was selected to fight Rhondda for Labour, after the party's shock defeat to Plaid Cymru's Geraint Davies at the 1999 Assembly election. Andrews retook the seat, with the highest increase in Labour's vote of any constituency in Wales (+21.1%) and its highest constituency vote.

In his first term as an Assembly Member, he sat on the Economic Development and Transport Committee (later called the Enterprise, Innovation and Networks Committee) (January 2005 – April 2007); Audit Committee (June 2003 – April 2007); Culture, Welsh Language and Sport Committee (June 2003 – November 2005); and Education and Lifelong Learning Committee (June 2003 – January 2005).

On the back-benches from July 2013 to September 2014, he sat on the Communities, Equality and Local Government committee and the Health and Social Services committee.

Minister
Andrews was appointed to the Welsh Assembly Government on 31 May 2007, as a Deputy Minister for Social Justice and Public Service Delivery, with special responsibility for housing. His speech in the Assembly on 27 June set out the broad thrust of the housing agenda which was to form the policy of the new coalition government.

On 19 July 2007 he was appointed as Deputy Minister for Regeneration in the coalition government, where he led the Heads of the Valleys and Mon a Menai programmes, and launched several Strategic Regeneration Areas across Wales. He was also responsible for digital inclusion.

In the autumn of 2009 he was campaign manager for Carwyn Jones' successful campaign to become Welsh Labour Leader. Jones's election to the post was announced on 1 December.

Following Carwyn Jones's election as First Minister on 8 December 2009, Andrews was appointed by Jones to the Welsh Assembly Government Cabinet on 10 December as Minister for Children, Education & Lifelong Learning. He became Minister for Education and Skills in the Welsh Government after the 2011 election campaign when Labour won the right to govern alone, with additional responsibility for the Welsh Language. Andrews was forced to resign as Minister in June 2013, when Carwyn Jones told him he had broken the Ministerial Code by campaigning against the closure of Pentre Primary School in his Rhondda constituency. After just over a year on the back-benches, he returned to the government on 11 September 2014 as Minister for Public Services, against a background of funding cuts and proposals from the Williams Commission for changes including extensive reform of local government boundaries.

Education agenda
Andrews introduced a series of reforms as Education Minister, in schools, in higher education, and student finance.

He set out his schools agenda in a speech in February 2011 which was intended as a response to Wales's poor showing in the 2009 PISA results. His speech, which contained a 20-point plan, became the focus of Welsh Labour's education reforms after the May 2011 Assembly elections and his reforms have largely been continued by his successor, Huw Lewis, who was Andrews's deputy from December 2009 to May 2011. Andrews introduced banding of schools (since modified into a categorisation of schools), reforms of school governance, the Literacy and Numeracy Framework accompanied by reading tests for years 2–9, and the review of Qualifications.

Andrews was a strong proponent of the longstanding policy to merge universities in Wales to establish larger, more stable institutions. This agenda, and the Minister's political approach to it, proved to be extremely controversial. His campaign opened with a blunt speech to vice-chancellors, whereby he accused them of ignoring the Welsh Assembly Government, and announcing a review into the governance and sustainability of the HE sector.  At the time, his statement was met with cautious welcome, particularly from academics. After a scandal involving quality control at the University of Wales, Andrews forced its closure.  His policy led to the merger of Swansea Met and Trinity St David's, along with the University of Wales, to create one university out of four predecessor institutions, with the option of merging further with local FE colleges to produce a new post-16 educational model. The University of Glamorgan also merged with the University of Newport to form the University of South Wales, but Andrews gave up on his original plan to merge the two with Cardiff Metropolitan University, formerly UWIC.

In November 2010, Andrews announced that, contrary to the policy of the Conservative/Liberal Democrat coalition in Westminster, Welsh students would not have to pay £9000 tuition fees no matter where they studied. That policy became one of Welsh Labour's pledges in the 2011 Assembly election and has been delivered throughout this Assembly term.

GCSE remarking 2012

In September 2012, Andrews ordered the remarking of several thousand GCSE English papers in Wales that had been affected by a very late change in the marking scheme. His move was greeted with great relief and enthusiasm by teachers and candidates.  However, it drew strong criticism from Michael Gove, who accused Andrews of being 'irresponsible and mistaken'. Andrews subsequently announced that Wales would have an independent exam regulator, Qualifications Wales.

Welsh language

A Welsh learner, Andrews published the first Welsh-Medium Education Strategy, legislated to make Welsh Language Education Strategic plans statutory, with a provision for Welsh Ministers to force local authorities to undertake assessments of parental demand for Welsh-medium education, published a new Welsh Language Strategy in 2012, appointed the first Welsh Language Commissioner, created a Welsh language digital technology fund, and set up reviews of the Eisteddfod, Welsh second language education, and Welsh for Adults. In 2013 he was criticised for rejecting many of the recommendations of the commissioner.

Local government reform

As Public Services Minister, Andrews took forward the local government reform agenda, building on the Williams Commission proposals, with a White Paper in February 2015, Power to Local People. In June 2015 he published the Welsh Government's preferred option of a map of 8 or 9 local authorities in Wales, and took the first Local Government Bill through the Assembly. In November 2015 he published the draft Local Government Reform and Merger Bill, which was not enacted before the 2016 Assembly elections.

Violence against Women, Domestic Abuse and Sexual Violence (Wales) Act

Andrews inherited from his predecessor, Lesley Griffiths, a Gender-based violence Bill, and took early steps to rename it to the name under which it was eventually passed into law in 2015.

Ministerial resignation
Andrews actively campaigned to keep the Pentre Primary School in his Rhondda constituency open, arguing that Rhondda Cynon Taf County Borough Council had failed to carry out an appropriate community impact assessment.  However, others saw this as conflicting with his role as Education Minister. As a result, Andrews was criticised by members of the Welsh Assembly, and resigned on 25 June 2013 after First Minister Carwyn Jones refused to support his position. This was the first forced resignation in the history of the Welsh Assembly or Welsh Government.

Assembly defeat

Andrews lost his Assembly seat at the 2016 National Assembly for Wales election when he was defeated by Leanne Wood, the leader of Plaid Cymru. He described his campaign defeat in a post for Labour Uncut. He subsequently made it clear that he would not re-stand for the seat at the next Assembly election in 2021.

Labour membership
In May 2019, Andrews wrote a blog post explaining he had left the Labour Party, amid concerns over leader Jeremy Corbyn's Brexit policy, and his handling of the anti-Semitism crisis in the party, and would be voting for the Green Party of England and Wales in the 2019 European Parliament election in the United Kingdom.He subsequently sought to rejoin the Labour Party to vote in the 2020 leadership election, explaining he had returned to voting Labour at the 2019 UK General Election. He welcomed the election of Buffy Williams who won the Rhondda Senedd seat back for Labour in the 2021 Senedd Election, defeating Plaid Cymru's Leanne Wood.

Rhondda constituency issues

Burberry

On 6 September 2006 Burberry announced the closure of its Treorchy factory. Immediately the GMB union announced a campaign to save the factory, backed by Andrews and local MP Chris Bryant.

The factory closed in March 2007, with the loss of 300 jobs. Though the factory closed, the campaign secured an extended life for its operation, better redundancy terms for the Burberry workers, and a trust fund for the Rhondda worth £150,000 per year over the next ten years. In her review of the year 2007, the Rhondda-born journalist Carolyn Hitt said:Labour AM Leighton Andrews and MP Chris Bryant fought a passionate campaign to save 300 jobs at the Burberry clothing factory in their Rhondda constituency. But even the added celebrity glitter of Dame Judi Dench, Ioan Gruffudd and Emma Thompson couldn’t persuade the grasping label to stay. The campaign did, however, ensure a better redundancy deal and long-term community fund for the workforce. BBC Wales named Andrews and Bryant as joint campaigners of the year in the 2007 political awards for their work in the campaign.

Media
His media and debating skills were recognised in December 2005 when he was named as Best New AM in the ITV Wales Political Awards; and Best Communicator in the BBC Wales AM-PM awards. He was the first politician in Wales to be ITV Wales Politician of the Year on two occasions, in 2011 and 2012, in recognition of his agenda-setting work as Education Minister.

Attitude to devolution
Andrews voted 'Yes' in the first referendum on devolution in 1979, his first ever vote. He was one of the founders of the Yes campaign in 1997.

Andrews supported primary law-making powers for the National Assembly for Wales, provided they were approved by the people of Wales in a referendum. He argued at the Welsh Labour Special Conference in September 2004 that this should have been Welsh Labour's response to the Richard Commission, arguing "Are we really going to say that Rhodri Morgan cannot have primary law-making powers when Gerry Adams and the Reverend Ian Paisley can?"

In the autumn of 2010, he was asked by First Minister Carwyn Jones and Deputy First Minister Ieuan Wyn Jones to convene the planning group for the Yes campaign in the successful March 2011 referendum on the Assembly's law-making powers.

References

External links
Website and blog of Leighton Andrews AM
National Assembly for Wales Member profile
Assembly Handbook

Offices held

1957 births
Living people
Academics of Cardiff Business School
Academics of Cardiff University
Alumni of Bangor University
Alumni of the University of Sussex
Liberal Party (UK) parliamentary candidates
Members of the Welsh Assembly Government
Politicians from Cardiff
Welsh Labour members of the Senedd
Wales AMs 2003–2007
Wales AMs 2007–2011
Wales AMs 2011–2016
Welsh-speaking politicians